Rossington is an unincorporated community in central Alberta within Westlock County, located  north of Highway 18,  northwest of St. Albert.

Localities in Westlock County